Richelieu is a provincial electoral riding in the Montérégie region of Quebec, Canada, which elects members to the National Assembly of Quebec.  It notably includes the municipalities of Sorel-Tracy, Sainte-Anne-de-Sorel, Saint-Roch-de-Richelieu and Sainte-Victoire-de-Sorel.

It was created for the 1867 election (and an electoral district of that name existed earlier in the Legislative Assembly of the Province of Canada and the Legislative Assembly of Lower Canada).  Its final election was in 1936.  It disappeared in the 1939 election and its successor electoral district was Richelieu-Verchères.

However, Richelieu-Verchères disappeared in the 1944 election and its successor electoral district was the re-created Richelieu.

In the change from the 2001 to the 2011 electoral map, it gained territory from Nicolet-Yamaska and from Verchères electoral districts.

It is named after former French Cardinal Armand Jean du Plessis de Richelieu.

Members of the Legislative Assembly / National Assembly

Election results

^ Change is from redistributed results. CAQ change is from ADQ.

References

External links
Information
 Elections Quebec

Election results
 Election results (National Assembly)
 Election results (QuébecPolitique)

Maps
 2011 map (PDF)
 2001 map (Flash)
2001–2011 changes (Flash)
1992–2001 changes (Flash)
 Electoral map of Montérégie region
 Quebec electoral map, 2011 

Richelieu
Sorel-Tracy